This is a list of mayors of Grenoble.


Mayors from 1790 to 1904

 Joseph Marie de Barral (02/1790-08/1790)
 Antoine Barnave (08/1790-11/1790)
 Daniel d'Isoard (11/1790-11/1791)
 Léonard Joseph Prunelle de Lierre (11/1791-12/1792)
 Joseph Marie de Barral (12/1792-05/1794)
 Victor Dumas (05/1794-10/1794)
 Pierre-François Arthaud (1794-1795)
 Joseph Martin (1795-1798)
 Jean-Baptiste Berthier (1798-1800)
 Joseph Marie de Barral (1800-1800)
 Charles Renauldon (1800-1815)
 Pierre Giroud (1815-1816)
 marquis Jean-François de Pina de Saint-Didier (1816-1818)
 Antoine Royer-Deloche (1818-1820)
 marquis Charles Laurent Joseph Marie de La Valette (1820-1823)
 Marc Louis Gautier (1823-1824)
 marquis Jean-François de Pina de Saint-Didier (1824-1830)
 Félix Penet (1830-1831)
 Vincent Rivier (1831-1835)
 Honoré-Hugues Berriat (1835-1842)
 comte Artus de Miribel (1842-1845)
 Frédéric Marc Joseph Taulier (1845-1848)
 Frédéric Farconnet (1848-1848)
 Ferdinand Reymond (1848-1848)
 Adolphe Anthoard (1848-1849)
 Frédéric Taulier (1849-1851)
 Joseph Arnaud (1851-1853)
 Louis Crozet (1853-1858)
 Eugène Gaillard (1858-1865)
 Jean-Thomas Vendre (1865-1870)
 Adolphe Anthoard (1870-1871)
 Napoléon Dantart (1871-1871)
 Jean-Marie Farge (1871-1871)
 Ernest Calvat (1871-1874)
 Félix Giraud (1874-1875)
 Auguste Gaché (1875-1881)
 Édouard Rey (1881-1888)
 Auguste Gaché (1875-1881)
 Félix Poulat (1896-1896)
 Stéphane Jay (1896-1904)

Mayors from 1904 to present

See also
 Timeline of Grenoble

Grenoble
History of Grenoble